The badminton women's singles tournament at the 2010 Asian Games in Guangzhou took place 16–20 November 2010 at Tianhe Gymnasium.

Schedule
All times are China Standard Time (UTC+08:00)

Results

Final

Top half

Bottom half

References 
 Results
Asian Games Complete Results

External links 
 Bracket

Badminton at the 2010 Asian Games